Middle Kingdom may refer to:

Nation 
 Middle Kingdom, a name for China derived from the translation of its native Chinese name, Zhongguo
 Middle Kingdom of Egypt, scholarly designation of The Period of Reunification
 Middle kingdoms of India, political entities from the 3rd century BC to the 1200s

Other 
A region of the Society for Creative Anachronism, consisting of several states in the Midwestern U.S.
A former attraction of Ocean Park Hong Kong
The Middle Kingdom (album), of 2000 by Celtic metal band Cruachan
The Middle Kingdoms series of novels by Diane Duane